Caitlin "Kate" Pike is a character in the American TV series JAG portrayed by Andrea Parker. She appears as the partner of Harmon "Harm" Rabb (David James Elliott) in the pilot episode. Pike then appears as a recurring character in the first season and makes a guest appearance in the sixth season.

Biography
It is unclear where Caitlin Pike is from and there is no background information about her family. Although during the Pilot episode, it is revealed that Kate is 27 years old (in July 1995), so her birth year would have been 1967–68. Pike is a graduate of the United States Naval Academy and Harvard Law School. Caitlin "Kate" Pike, a Lieutenant JG and Harmon Rabb were paired together as Admiral Brovo (Kevin Dunn) wanted someone to be on the carrier as soon as possible and she and Harm were the two available. During the pilot episode, upon discovering the birth control in the missing RIO's lock box, Harm suggests that the RIO had a lover, for which he seems grateful and says Kate is against the idea of having a lover in the same forces.

Pike received a promotion, from Lieutenant Junior Grade to Lieutenant somewhere between the pilot episode and the eighth episode of the first season. This was apparently the time period in which she and Harm spent a weekend together, since in "Brig Break" Harm tells her that he and Meg have a strictly professional relationship and Kate reminds him that she and he once did before they crossed that line with that weekend. Kate was good friends with Meg Austin (Tracey Needham), Harm's second Partner. It was assumed that Kate was then transferred shortly after "Brig Break" to the naval base in Okinawa.

There she worked closely with another Navy lawyer, Dennis Brockman (John Dossett). It was revealed that the two worked so closely that they began a sexual relationship and kept it under wraps for almost six months until he actually asked her to marry him. Kate turned him down and broke off the relationship. During "Ares" the audience finds out, through Harm's persistent questioning of Kate about what happened and she reluctantly gave him the answers for which he was pushing her. Shortly after, Caitlin decided to spend some time at the Naval Criminal Investigative Service.

Kate also appeared in the sixth season, at this time Pike (now at the rank of Commander) was considering returning to her position at JAG HQ, however when an old sexual harassment incident arose, she decided to move on. It turned out that Lieutenant Loren Singer (Nanci Chambers) had been the leak on the case, giving the press the information about what happened between Commander Caitlin Pike and Rear Admiral Kurt Hollenback (Ray Baker), the Naval Inspector General-designate, the Commanding Officer years before with whom Kate had worked and who had assaulted her. There were two views shown on what happened, obviously from the opposing sides of the case; Hollenback and Kate's points of view and it turned out that Hollenback apologized and the two moved on, though he evidently won the case against her.

Kate then felt bad that his career was ruined. She confronted Sarah "Mac" MacKenzie (Catherine Bell), thinking she had been the leak going on information she had given her during a conversation over coffee when Kate had seen the article printed about her in the newspaper. Mac gave Kate some critical advice about being discreet. Kate then confronted Lt. Singer about leaking the information on the case, saying that Hollenback had her forgiveness, but Singer did not. During the last scene of "Touch and Go", Kate picks up on Harm and Sarah's affections for one another and tells him that she feels that way and doesn't want to complicate things further for him between him, Renee and Mac.

Awards and decorations 
The following are the medals and service awards fictionally worn by Commander Caitlin "Kate" Pike, JAGC, USN in the sixth season of JAG.

References

JAG (TV series) characters
Television characters introduced in 1995
Fictional United States Navy personnel
Fictional lieutenants
Fictional commanders
Fictional American lawyers